Walker's Creek Presbyterian Church is a historic Presbyterian church and cemetery located near Pearisburg, Giles County, Virginia. The church was built in 1897–1898, and is a one-story, "L"-shaped, frame building in the Gothic Revival style.  It features a metal-sheathed gable roof, painted poplar
weatherboard siding, a sandstone foundation, and an entry / bell tower.  The adjacent church cemetery was established in 1911.

It was listed on the National Register of Historic Places in 2003, with a boundary increase in 2006.

References

Carpenter Gothic church buildings in Virginia
Churches completed in 1898
19th-century Presbyterian church buildings in the United States
Buildings and structures in Giles County, Virginia
Churches on the National Register of Historic Places in Virginia
Presbyterian churches in Virginia
National Register of Historic Places in Giles County, Virginia
1898 establishments in Virginia